Velvet Darkness They Fear is the second studio album by the Norwegian gothic metal band Theatre of Tragedy. It was released in 1996 by Massacre Records. The album was issued in the US by Century Media Records in 1997.

In 2021, it was elected by Metal Hammer as the 14th best symphonic metal album of all time.

Music 
Velvet Darkness They Fear continued Theatre of Tragedy's particular brand of gothic metal, first heard in their first album, Theatre of Tragedy, defined by alternating and occasionally overlapping male death grunts and sung female vocals. This style, which was copied later by many metal bands, is generally known as 'Beauty and the Beast'.

Velvet Darkness They Fear also continued the use of Raymond Rohonyi's Early Modern English lyrics. "Der Tanz der Schatten", which is written in German, is the exception. The songs themselves rarely have a clear story, but death, undeath, demons and similar supernatural elements are all prominent. The lyrics to the songs are referred to within the sleeve notes as 'plays', 'poems' and one 'soliloquy', depending on the parts the singers play.

The fifth track, "And When He Falleth", includes a section of Jane Asher and Vincent Price's dialogue from the film The Masque of the Red Death.

The album sold over 125,000 copies.

Track listing

Personnel

Theatre of Tragedy
Raymond Rohonyi - vocals
Liv Kristine Espenæs - vocals
Tommy Lindal - guitars
Geir Flikkeid - guitars and e-bow
Lorentz Aspen - piano, synthesizer, strings composition
Eirik T. Saltrø - bass
Hein Frode Hansen - drums

Additional musicians
Streicherensemble Nedelfo Boiadjiev - strings

Production
Pete Coleman - producer, engineer, mixing
Gerhard Magin - engineer, mixing, mastering
Klaus Wagenleiter - strings composition and arrangements, strings recording at MTS Albstadt
Tom Krüger - strings recording

External links
Discography at Theatre of Tragedy's official website

References 

1996 albums
Theatre of Tragedy albums
Massacre Records albums